Northern Arrow (Hets Hatsafon) is a one-day road cycling race held annually since 2011. It is located in Israel with both starting and finishing in Bar'am. It became part of UCI Europe Tour under category 1.2 in 2016.

Winners

References

Cycle races in Israel
UCI Europe Tour races
Recurring sporting events established in 2016
Summer events in Israel